Jason Kingsley Drummond (born June 1969) is a British technology entrepreneur. He is known for founding nine technology companies that have listed on European stock exchanges.

Early & personal life
Drummond was born to parents Mark and Barbara Drummond, who divorced when Drummond was four years old. He was raised in Fulham, London as the middle child of three boys in a single parent household following his father's estrangement from the family.

Drummond was first married to Jackie, in 1992. They later divorced and he became engaged in 2009 to Helen Dawson, daughter of Yorkshire businessman and founder of the Tunstall Group, Michael Dawson.

Early business career & Virtual Internet
While attending his local comprehensive school Burlington Danes High School in Fulham  the Guardian reported that at 15 Drummond started his first business Micromax, which sold games software through newsagents. Drummond then invested his Micromax earnings in Amstrad shares, which subsequently quadrupled in value. Drummond left school at 18 after studying for his "A" levels and began work as a salesman for Reed Business Publishing in 1987. While working for Reed Drummond saw his first fax machine and, using his profits from Micromax and Amstrad shares, he left Reed to set-up IDL Communications, a distributor of fax machines and mobile telephones. From this the Guardian reported that Drummond went on to set-up and sell a number of unnamed computer and technology businesses.

At the age of 22, in the early 1990s, the Guardian reported that Drummond had taken a year out to travel with his wife Jackie while simultaneously setting-up communications products companies in Russia and South Africa.

In 1996, using savings of ten thousand pounds, Drummond founded Virtual Internet, an online intellectual property protection and web hosting services company. Virtual Internet was admitted to the Alternative Investment Market (AIM), a sub-market of the London Stock Exchange, via a reverse takeover worth £15 million in January 1999. The move was reported by the Guardian to have resulted in Drummond retaining 70% of the company's shares while netting himself £1 million in cash. Four months later, in April 1999, the Guardian reported that Drummond's 70% stake was valued at £23 million.

In September 1999, Drummond appeared on the first broadcast episode of a new Channel 4 UK television show called "Show Me the Money." In the show Drummond promoted the notional purchase of Virtual Internet shares for an imaginary share portfolio held by contestants. In the episode shown the show's contestants ignored Drummond's advice and opted instead to notionally buy other shares of their own choosing for their imaginary share portfolio.

In November 1999 the Guardian reported that TV personality Angus Deayton had provided media glamour to launch Drummond's second business venture coms.com, a "follow me" telecoms service.

In March 2000 the Guardian reported that the value of Drummond's Virtual Internet shareholding had increased to £123 million and described him as being richer than all of the Spice Girls put together by the age of 30 and virtually unknown. In the same month Virtual Internet combined a £27 million fundraising, at 900 pence a share, with a move to the Official List of the London Stock Exchange, valuing the company at over £200 million and netting Drummond £6 million in cash. Three months later, in June 2000, the Guardian reported that Virtual Internet's shares had lost 34% of their value in one day and were trading at 213 pence a share following a delayed product launch and a threefold increase in six month losses to £4.2 million.

In April 2001 the Telegraph calculated that Drummond's Virtual Internet shareholding had lost £104 million in value and two months later, in June 2001, Drummond stood down as chief executive of Virtual Internet. In February 2002, with the Guardian reporting that Virtual Internet's share price had fallen to as low as 15.5 pence the previous year, it was reported by the Independent that Drummond had agreed to sell his remaining 50.8% Virtual Internet shareholding for just under 47 pence a share to Nasdaq listed Register.com. The Independent further reported that the transaction valued the whole of Virtual Internet at slightly less than £12 million and had netted Drummond £6.1 million in cash. Simultaneously Virtual Internet released results showing that the company had made a pre-tax loss of £19.7 million for the year to the 31st of October 2001, an increase on the nearly £8 million of losses reported for the previous year. The Guardian later reported that Drummond had become involved in a tax dispute arising from the sale of some of his Virtual Internet shares during which KPMG, who acted for Drummond, were said in a tax tribunal hearing to have involved themselves in "acting out a charade" in their efforts to reduce Drummond's tax liability.

2000-2010
In March 2000, Drummond founded Xworks Limited, an e-business incubator, which was admitted to trading on AIM in April 2001 with a market cap of £4.4m at 10p a share. In August 2002, Xworks changed its name to Gaming Corporation to reflect its principal business "casino.co.uk".

Drummond was also the founder of Coms plc (L.COMS), an internet communications company. He founded the business in September 2003 and listed it on AIM in September 2006.

Drummond was a significant shareholder in Active ISP (which was later renamed to Active 24 ASA), a company which listed on the Oslo Stock Exchange In October 2004 with a market cap of NOK 270m. The company was taken over by Mamut ASA and subsequently acquired by Visma in the summer of 2011 and delisted from the Oslo Exchange.

In March 2005, Gaming Corporation raised £10m and in May 2005 it acquired Gambling.com, the global leader in search for gambling sites since 1997, for $20m USD. For the year ending September 2006, Gaming Corporation made profits of £2.5m. In October 2006 the US SAFE Port Act made online payments by US customers to online gaming companies illegal, causing a drop in revenues and profits for Gambling.com and a write-down in its value.

Drummond was a co-founder of Betex Technologies in 2005 which became part of Betex Group PLC, whose shares were listed on the Alternative Investment Market (AIM) in June 2006. Betex was a technology company focussed on lottery management, with its main operations in China. In April 2007 its shares were suspended from trading on AIM following the arrests of two senior staff in China and in May 2007 three Betex directors resigned after failing to receive assurances from Chinese authorities that they would not face arrest upon entering the country.

In November 2005 Drummond co-founded FairFx  a peer-to-peer foreign currency exchange business.

In December 2005, Drummond also co-founded Shellworks Ltd, which was admitted to trading on AIM as Nettworx plc having raised £10 million, £8.1 million of which was returned to investors following the company's AIM listing being cancelled in 2009  and its subsequent liquidation.

In October 2006, Gaming Corporation changed its name to Media Corporation. The company sold Casino.co.uk to CryptoLogic for £3.62m in cash in August 2007 and acquired the online poker and casino operator Purple Lounge Limited for up to £465,000 in October 2009 followed by a surge in online poker and casino revenues in 2010.

Drummond was a director of Metacharge Limited between September 2006 and October 2006, an Internet payment service provider that was later sold to PayPoint plc for £8.4m in October 2006.

2011-2020
In April 2011 Media Corporation sold its Gambling.com domain name and website to KAX Media for £1.5 million and in February 2012 Drummond stepped down from his role as executive chairman of Media Corporation. In July 2012 Media Corporation placed its online poker and casino business Purple Lounge Limited into liquidation and in August 2013 announced a cessation of substantially all of its business trading.

Also in August 2013 Drummond was appointed non-executive Chairman, later becoming executive chairman and CEO, of London Stock Exchange Main Market  company C.A. Sperati, a supplier of buttons and other garment related items. Sperati subsequently sold its buttons and garment related business, along with a freehold property it owned in Greenwich, London and moved its Stock Market listing to the Alternative Investment Market. In February 2015 Sperati changed its name to Teathers Financial Plc  and in May 2016 a General Meeting was requisitioned by a number of Teathers' shareholders calling for the removal of the company's board of directors. In June 2016 the Alternative Investment Market cancelled Teathers's stock market listing  and Drummond resigned as a director of Teathers in the same month.

Drummond founded Gametech UK Limited in November 2013, subsequently raising over £7 million in finance for the company. Gametech UK was licensed and regulated by the UK Gambling Commission with the Cyprus Securities and Exchange Commission (CySec) regulating its subsidiary Gametech (Cyprus) Limited. Both Gametech companies combined to market and offer mobile binary options betting directly to the UK public and beyond under the brand names 'NENX' and 'ProOptions'. The UK company went into administration in April 2017, with the appointed administrators Begbies Traynor citing the decision came about as a result of operational difficulties.

In August 2014 FairFX Group plc (which later became Equals Group plc), floated on the AIM Market of the London Stock Exchange with Drummond holding a 7% stake and acting as the company's non-executive Chairman. In November 2014 Drummond resigned his position as non-executive Chairman  and in 2015 reduced his shareholding in the company. In 2017 FairFX had a turnover of £1.1 billion (2017). Also in 2017 FairFX raised £25m and acquired Q Money and its e-money licence.

2021 onward
In June 2021 Drummond listed Gaming Technologies Inc., a company he founded in 2019 which develops online gambling games and part owns the Mexico-based online casino and sports betting site www.vale.mx, on the US OTCQB market.

Legal challenge and vindication
In August 2019 The Sunday Telegraph reported that a former shareholder of failed AIM listed gambling venture Media Corporation had commenced a private prosecution against Drummond and his younger brother Justin, with both being summonsed to attend Westminster Magistrates Court in London to face six charges each of fraud and theft. In response Drummond and his brother denied any wrongdoing and claimed the allegations were frivolous, malicious and on-going harassment by the former shareholder.

The prosecution was later dropped by the former shareholder and at a hearing held in February 2020 Drummond and his brother were awarded costs of £59,200 by the Judge following his finding that the former shareholder had acted improperly by introducing evidence which he "either knew, or strongly suspected to be a forgery".

References

1969 births
Living people
British businesspeople